Obergriesbach is a municipality  in southern Bavaria in Germany. It is part of the Aichach-Friedberg district and located some 22 km from Augsburg.

References

External links
 official website (German)

Aichach-Friedberg